The estampie (Occitan and) is a medieval dance and musical form which was a popular instrumental and vocal form in the 13th and 14th centuries. The name was also applied to poetry.

Musical form
The estampie is similar in form to the lai, consisting of a succession of repeated notes. According to Johannes de Grocheio, there were both vocal and instrumental estampies (for which he used the Latin calque "stantipes"), which differed somewhat in form. 

Grocheio calls the sections in both the French vocal and instrumental estampie puncta (singular punctus), Each puncta has a pair of lines that repeat the same melody, in the form:

aa, bb, cc, etc..

The two statements of the melody in each punctus differ only in their endings, described as apertum ("open") and clausum ("closed") by Grocheio, who believed that six puncta were standard for the stantipes (his term for the estampie), though he was aware of stantipes with seven puncta. The structure can therefore be diagrammed as:

a+x, a+y; b+w, b+z; etc..

In an instrumental estampie, the open and closed endings of the puncta are the same each time, so that the end of the punctum serves as the refrain, in the form:

a+x, a+y; b+x, b+y, c+x, c+y, etc.

In comparison to other dance forms, Grocheio considered the instrumental estampie "complicated," with puncta of varying lengths This is in contrast to the more regular verse length of the ductia. There are also more puncta in an estampie than in a ductia. He further states that this difficulty captivates the attention of both the players and listeners because of these complications. According to Grocheio, the vocal estampie begins with a refrain, which is repeated at the end of each stanza, with text and melody independent of the stanza. However, surviving songs do not include a section labeled as a refrain, so some scholars suggest that a convention must have existed for choosing lines to use as a refrain. Like the instrumental form, the vocal dance was complicated enough to require concentration, which helps to distract young people from wicked thoughts.

History 
The estampie is the first known genre of medieval era dance music which continues to exist today. The earliest reported example of this musical form is the song "Kalenda maya", written by the troubadour Raimbaut de Vaqueiras (1180–1207), possibly to a preexisting melody.  14th century examples include estampies with subtitles such as "Isabella" and "Tre fontane".

Instrumentation 
Sources for individual songs do not generally indicate what instruments were used. However, according to Grocheio, the vielle was the supreme instrument of the period, and the stantipes, together with the cantus coronatus and ductia, were the principal forms played on vielles before the wealthy in their celebration. Though the estampie is generally monophonic, there are also two-voice compositions in the form of an estampie, such as the two for keyboard in the Robertsbridge Fragment. The French estampie was performed in a lively triple meter, a primary division of three beats to the bar.

Dance

Etymology
According to the OED, the name comes from the Provençal estampida, feminine of estampit, the past participle of estampir "to resound".

Footnotes

References
 
 L. Hibberd. "Estampie and Stantipes". Speculum XIX, 1944, 222-249.
 Pierre Aubry. Estampies et danses royales; les plus anciens textes de musique instrumentale au Moyen-Âge (1906). Genève : Minkoff, 1975 (reprint). .
 Willi Apel. Harvard Dictionary of Music (1970) Heinemann Educational Books Ltd.
 
 C. Schima. Die Estampie (1995) . See also Estampie Schima
 
 
 
 
 
  .
 

Medieval dance
Medieval music genres